Carex eriocarpa is a tussock-forming perennial in the family Cyperaceae. It is native to parts of Turkey.

See also
 List of Carex species

References

eriocarpa
Plants described in 1903
Taxa named by Georg Kükenthal
Taxa named by Heinrich Carl Haussknecht
Flora of Turkey